The City Road Baptist Church  is a Baptist church on Upper York Street, Stokes Croft in Bristol, England.

It was built in 1861 by the Gloucester architects James Medland and Alfred William Maberly. Charles Spurgeon preached at the opening on 11 September.

It has been designated by English Heritage as a Grade II listed building. The church is built of snecked masonry with limestone dressings in the Italianate style.

See also
 Churches in Bristol
 Grade II listed buildings in Bristol

References

External links
City Road Baptist Church website

Churches completed in 1861
Grade II listed churches in Bristol
Baptist churches in Bristol
1861 establishments in England